Marchmont is a locality in the Yass Valley Council, New South Wales, Australia. It lies on the Barton Highway about 10 km to the southeast of Yass.

Heritage listings 
Marchmont has a number of heritage-listed sites, including:

 Yass Valley Way: Cooma Cottage

References

Yass Valley Council
Localities in New South Wales
Southern Tablelands